Causonis clematidea, known as the native grape or slender grape, is a common Australian vine in the grape family. Growing in or on the edges of tropical forest, from the Shoalhaven River gorges north to Queensland. Tendrils form opposite the leaf.

Description 
C. clematidea has compound leaves with a terminal leaflet. Usually five toothed leaflets. 1 to 8 cm long. 5 mm to 40 mm wide. Small greenish flowers occur in summer. The grape is shiny black, 5 to 7 mm in diameter.

References 

 Rainforest Climbing Plants – Williams & Harden, 2000  page 13
 Plant Net, Cayratia clematidea http://plantnet.rbgsyd.nsw.gov.au/cgi-bin/NSWfl.pl?page=nswfl&lvl=sp&name=Cayratia~clematidea Retrieved 14 September 2009

clematidea
Rosids of Australia
Flora of New South Wales
Flora of Queensland
Taxa named by Ferdinand von Mueller